BNB may refer to:

People
Bad News Barrett (born 1980), English professional wrestler
Bad News Brown (musician) (1977–2011), Canadian musician of Haitian origin

Culture
, K. Beißwenger's 1992 compendium listing music manuscripts and printed music owned by J. S. Bach
Biographie Nationale de Belgique, the Belgian national biography
Bomb and Bubble (BnB), a player mode in the Korean game Crazy Arcade
British National Bibliography, the national bibliography for the United Kingdom and Ireland

Finance
Banco Nacional de Bolivia, a Bolivian bank and financial services company
Banque Nationale de Belgique, the National Bank of Belgium 
Barbados National Bank, part of Republic Bank
Bulgarian National Bank
BNB native cryptocurrency of the BNB Chain.

Other uses
Branch and Bound, an algorithm design paradigm for discrete or combinatorial problems
Bed and breakfast (sometimes spelled BnB)
Bikes Not Bombs
The IATA code of Boende Airport
British North Borneo